Devta is a 1998 Indian Hindi-language action drama film directed by Jagdish A Sharma, starring Mithun Chakraborty, Aditya Pancholi, Ayushi, Payal Malhotra, Arun Bakshi , Kiran Kumar and Tej Sapru. This film was released on 2 October 1998 under the banner of Mayura Films Combines.

Plot
Working as a taxi driver, Ballu saves the life of the mafia boss Bajang. This acquaintance leads Ballu to a gang, where He becomes an assassin named Tiger. One day, Ballu gets an order to kill a police officer, Rakesh. But after learning that his old lover Devika has become the wife of Rakesh, the killer decides to save the victim.

Cast
Mithun Chakraborty as Balram/Ballu Tiger
Aditya Pancholi as ACP Rakesh Mehra
Payal Malhotra as Madhu
 Ayshi as Devika
Kiran Kumar as Bajrang Pandey
Arun Bakshi 	
Tej Sapru
Mushtaq Khan as Lallan
Avtar Gill

Soundtrack
"Pehle Meri Aankh Ladi" - Hema Sardesai, Lalit Sen
"Dheere Dheere Ankh Ladi" - Udit Narayan, Alka Yagnik
"Chunri Bana Mujhe Odh Le" - Udit Narayan, Anuradha Paudwal
"Ek Toota Tara Hu" - Jaspinder Narula, Sonu Nigam, Anuradha Paudwal
"Meri Aankh Tana Tan" - Hema Sardesai, Lalit Sen

References

External links
 

1998 films
1990s Hindi-language films
Mithun's Dream Factory films
Films shot in Ooty
Films scored by Dilip Sen-Sameer Sen
Indian action drama films
1998 action films
Hindi-language action films